The Haraldmeier's mantella (Mantella haraldmeieri) is a species of frog in the family Mantellidae.
It is endemic to Madagascar.
Its natural habitats are subtropical or tropical moist lowland forests and rivers.
It is threatened by habitat loss.

References

Mantella
Amphibians described in 1981
Endemic frogs of Madagascar
Taxonomy articles created by Polbot